Utku Dalmaz (born September 9, 1985) is a Turkish electronic dance music producer, jazz guitarist and web developer. He has been releasing deep house and tech house music under the artist name Utku Dalmaz along with his other music projects.

Career
Utku Dalmaz started producing electronic music at the age of 21 in 2007. Studied music at Istanbul Bilgi University. Jazz music education and computer programming knowledge helped him to improve his producing skills. In that year he started DJing Istanbul's best clubs. In 2009, his productions already got attention and charted by successful producer/djs, many of his tracks reached top 100 charts on digital music stores such as Beatport, Traxsource. He released his first full-length album "Milky Way" from FHD Records  at the end of 2009. He played in clubs and festivals in UK, the Netherlands, Bulgaria, Moldova, Turkey and other countries along a range of successful artists.

After years of producing house and chill out music under a variety of names such as UDM Project and OUTOFME, he founded Sound Mass Records which releases tech house.

Discography

Selected singles
2008: - "I miss you"
2008: - "Mr. Mac"
2008: - "White Shoes"
2008: - "I am not you"
2009: - "Technoscope"
2009: - "Statiscope"
2009: - "Move Your Body"
2010: - "Station 9"
2011: - "NYC Lights"
2011: - "Call The Fireman"
2011: - "Okkala"
2012: - "The Love Cluster"
2012: - "All Night Love"
2012: - "Karışık"
2012: - "Blue Dolphin"
2012: - "Euphoria"
2013: - "Cryonized"
2013: - "Blue Brain"

Selected remixes
2009: - "Nick Olivetti - Glitter (Utku Dalmaz Remix)"
2010: - "Vas Floyd - I Am One (Utku Dalmaz Remix)"
2010: - "Stephan M - Marabou (Utku Dalmaz Remix)"
2010: - "Chase Buch, Nick Olivetti - Get Runny (Utku Dalmaz Remix)"
2011: - "Pepo, Elektriksoul - Work That Body (Utku Dalmaz Remix)"
2013: - "Jesus Soblechero - Boiler (Utku Dalmaz Remix)"

Albums
Milky Way (2009)
Eyes Wide Hot
Love Poison
That Night
Le Jazz Dans L'Espace
Meaningful
This is better
Wide Space
Apollo
Kangroove
Kangroove Re-rub

Web projects

Powerlabel.Net 
In 2010, after a long and hard work Utku founded Powerlabel.Net, which is an online promo service for record labels and DJs. Powerlabel service was discontinued in January 2016.

Credentials 
 His track "That Night" was featured in DJ Mag Special Stereo CD mixed by DJ Chus

References

External links
Official Website
Artist page on Beatport
Soundcloud Page
Youtube Page

Club DJs
Remixers
1985 births
Living people